"Koska et oo täällä enää" is a song performed by Finnish singer-songwriter Saara Aalto. It was released to digital retailers and streaming platforms on 1 November 2019 by Warner Music Finland. It was released as the second single from her seventh studio album Fairytale – Joulun taikaa.

Track listing

Personnel
Credits adapted from Tidal.
 Arto Ruotsala – producer, mixer, programmer
 Saara Aalto – producer, composer, lyricist, vocals
 Meri Sopanen – lyricist
 Pete Eklund – A&R manager

Charts

Release history

References

2019 songs
2019 singles
Saara Aalto songs
Warner Music Finland singles